is a Japanese manga series written and illustrated by Subaruichi. It was serialized in Shogakukan's Ura Sunday website and MangaONE app from December 2014 to December 2020, with its chapters collected into twenty tankōbon volumes. An anime television series adaptation by Liden Films is set to premiere in April 2023.

Premise
Sion Bladen sealed away the Demon King and his army at Hell's Gate. Now with the Demon King ready to rise again, Sion jumps back into battle to face his sworn enemy. Unfortunately, he ends up getting killed in a pig trap dug by farmer Touka Scott who was trying to defend himself from the demons. With no other option, necromancer Anri Haysworth puts Touka's perverted soul in the deceased body of Sion to pose as him. Along with Touka's childhood friend Yuna Eunice, the three mismatched heroes must rise to the challenge.

Characters

Media

Manga
Written and illustrated by Subaruichi, The Legendary Hero Is Dead! was serialized in Shogakukan's Ura Sunday website and MangaONE app from December 16, 2014, to December 14, 2020. Twenty tankōbon volumes have been published from May 2015 to March 2021. In Southeast Asia, the series is licensed by Shogakukan Asia.

A sequel titled  began serialization in the MangaONE app on May 9, 2022.

Volume list

Anime
An anime television series adaptation was announced on April 28, 2022. It is produced by Liden Films and directed by Rion Kujo, with scripts supervised by Yū Satō, character designs by Yosuke Yabumoto, monster and prop designs by Akito Fujiwara, and music composed by Kana Utatane, Yūki Nara, Yamazo, and MOKA☆, a group composed of Kayo Konishi and Yukio Kondо̄. The series is set to premiere on April 7, 2023, on Tokyo MX and BS11. Crunchyroll has licensed the series.

References

External links
  
  
 

2023 anime television series debuts
Adventure anime and manga
Anime series based on manga
Crunchyroll anime
Fantasy anime and manga
Japanese webcomics
Liden Films
Shogakukan manga
Shōnen manga
Tokyo MX original programming
Upcoming anime television series
Webcomics in print